Thomas Roberts (1897 – 28 September 1972) was a Welsh international rugby union player who played club rugby for Risca and Newport. He is the only player to have been directly capped from the Risca club.

Life history
Born in Risca, South Wales, in 1897, he made his international debut for Wales as a lock forward on 5 February 1921 against Scotland at Swansea, a match which Wales lost by 14 points to 8. Roberts played nine games for Wales between 1921 and 1923, all in the Five Nations Championship. His last game was against Scotland in Cardiff on 3 February 1923 in a game Wales lost 8–11.

He was a collier by occupation before he joined the Newport County Police Force. Roberts died on 28 September 1972 at Feniton, Devon.

References

1897 births
1972 deaths
Newport RFC players
Risca RFC players
Rugby union locks
Rugby union players from Risca
Wales international rugby union players
Welsh rugby union players